The 1946–47 Irish Cup was the 67th edition of the premier knock-out cup competition in Northern Irish football. 

Belfast Celtic won the tournament for the 8th and final time before their withdrawal from football in 1949, defeating Glentoran 1–0 in the final at Windsor Park.

Results

First round

|}

Quarter-finals

|}

Replay

|}

Semi-finals

|}

Replay

|}

Second replay

|}

Final

References

External links
 Northern Ireland Cup Finals. Rec.Sport.Soccer Statistics Foundation (RSSSF)

Irish Cup seasons
1946–47 domestic association football cups
1946–47 in Northern Ireland association football